Dušan Čater (born 1968) is a Slovene writer, editor and translator. He has published six novels, two of which have also been translated and published in Croatian.

Čater was born in Celje in 1968. He studied journalism and sociology at the University of Ljubljana and works as a freelance writer and translator. He has also written a number of books for children based on traditional stories and legends about figures like Kralj Matjaž, Peter Klepec and Veronika of Desenice.

Čater won the 2012 Fabula Award for Džehenem (Jahannam).

Novels
 Flash Royal (1994)
 Imitacija (Imitation) (1996)
 Resnični umori (Real Murders) (1997)
 Patosi (Pathoses) (1999)
 Ata je spet pijan (Pop's Drunk Again) (2002)
 Džehenem (Jahannam) (2010)

Children's books and youth literature
 Peter Klepec (1995)
 Kralj Matjaž (1996)
 Veronika Deseniška (1996)
 Pojdi z mano (2009)

Monographs
 Marilyn Monroe (1994)
 Casanova (1994)
 Oscar Wilde (1995)
 The Doors (2000)

References

Writers from Celje
Slovenian translators
Living people
1968 births
Slovenian editors
Slovenian children's writers
Fabula laureates
University of Ljubljana alumni